Mihnea is a Romanian-language masculine given name that may refer to:

Mihnea cel Rău
Mihnea Turcitul
Mihnea III
Mihnea Chioveanu
Mihnea Motoc
Mihnea-Ion Năstase
Mihnea Popa

Romanian masculine given names